is a Japanese video game producer. He worked for Konami and SNK Playmore.

Masaaki Kukino was born in Kurashiki, Okayama. He studied to become a clothing/textile designer. While he was researching a number of fashion companies & clothing brands, actually he came across an interesting arcade game company. So, he started to work as a producer, a designer, a director, making side-scrolling beat 'em ups, sports, action, driving, and gun (shooting) arcade games. 

He is the producer of The King of Fighters XII and The King of Fighters XIII.  

Masaaki Kukino left SNK Playmore in November 2010.

References

External links
 GameTrailer's Interview
 Masaaki Kukino Interviewed by Jeuxactu
 Masaaki Kukino's interview on KOF XIII

Japanese video game producers
Living people
People from Kurashiki
Year of birth missing (living people)